Cary Lady Clarets was an American women’s soccer team, founded in 2007. The team was a member of the United Soccer Leagues W-League, the second tier of women’s soccer in the United States and Canada. The team played in the Atlantic Division of the Eastern Conference. 

The team played its home games at WakeMed Soccer Park in Cary, North Carolina. The club's colors was claret, blue and white.

The team was a sister organization of the men's Carolina RailHawks team, which plays in the USL First Division. The formation of the women's team was announced on November 30, 2007 at a press conference at WakeMed Soccer Park. The team was originally named Carolina RailHawks Women; in November 2008, Next Level Academy, which owns the club, announced a partnership with Burnley Football Club of the English Championship in order to jointly develop professional footballers; as part of the agreement, the team was renamed the Cary Lady Clarets.

The team folded after the 2009 season.

The team was coached by Jay Howell, Director of Coaching at the Capital Area Soccer League in Raleigh, North Carolina, and features many players with local amateur or collegiate affiliations from Triangle area high schools and universities such as the University of North Carolina at Chapel Hill, Duke University, and North Carolina State University.

Players

Squad 2009

Year-by-year

External links
 Official Site
 Team Page on USLSoccer.com
 Triangle Soccer Fanatics, an independent supporters club of the Carolina RailHawks

References 

   

Association football clubs established in 2007
Sports in Raleigh-Durham
North Carolina FC
Burnley F.C.
USL W-League (1995–2015) teams
2007 establishments in North Carolina
2009 disestablishments in North Carolina
Association football clubs disestablished in 2009
Defunct soccer clubs in North Carolina
Women's sports in North Carolina